Diu may refer to:
 Diu, India, a city in Diu district in the union territory of Dadra and Nagar Haveli and Daman and Diu, India
 Diu district, part of the union territory of Dadra and Nagar Haveli and Daman and Diu
 Diu Island, an island and part of Diu district
 Daman and Diu, former union territory of India, now part of Dadra and Nagar Haveli and Daman and Diu
 Diu Head, a headland in the Arabian Sea
 Diu (Cantonese), a Cantonese profanity
 Buth Diu (died 1972), Sudanese politician

DIU may refer to:
 Dansk Interlingua Union, an organization that promotes Interlingua in Denmark
 Defense Innovation Unit, a US Department of Defense organization
 Diplôme interuniversitaire, a French degree
 Diu Airport, in Diu, India, IATA code: DIU
 Divisional Intelligence Unit, police intelligence at the divisional level
 Down-with-Imperialism Union, a union formed by Kim Il-sung, president of North Korea
 , part of Dresden University in Germany
 Dubrovnik International University in Croatia
 Diamond Is Unbreakable, the fourth part of manga series JoJo's Bizarre Adventure
 Daffodil International University in Bangladesh

See also 
 Diou (disambiguation)
 Diu Diu Cave, in Papua New Guinea
 the military confrontation that took place at Diu, India: Battle of Diu, Siege of Diu, Second Siege of Diu, and Siege of Diu